The European University Association (EUA) represents more than 800 institutions of higher education in 48 countries, providing them with a forum for cooperation and exchange of information on higher education and research policies. Members of the Association are European universities involved in teaching and research, national associations of rectors and other organisations active in higher education and research.

EUA is the result of a merger between the Association of European Universities and the Confederation of European Union Rectors' Conferences. The merger took place in Salamanca on 31 March 2001.

Membership
The following is a breakdown of EUA membership by country:

In March 2022, the EUA suspended 12 Russian members following the 2022 address of the Russian Union of Rectors (RUR) supporting the 2022 Russian invasion of Ukraine, for being "diametrically opposed to the European values that they committed to when joining EUA”.

See also
 Agence universitaire de la Francophonie (AUF)
 Association of African Universities
 Association of Arab and European Universities (AEUA)
 Association of Commonwealth Universities
 Association of Pacific Rim Universities
 EURODOC
 European Association for International Education
 European Association for Quality Assurance in Higher Education
 European Association of Institutions in Higher Education (EURASHE)
 European Students' Union
 European University Information Systems
 Independent European Universities

Notes and references

External links
Official website
Mission and activities, Statutes
List of Member Universities
Board members

2001 establishments in Belgium
Higher education organisations based in Europe
Organizations established in 2001
Organisations based in Brussels